Feather Woman Falls is a waterfall located in Glacier National Park, Montana, US. The falls emerge from the base of a terminal moraine and drop  towards the valley below. Altogether there are at least four waterfalls in this series, each originating from a permanent snowfield where a glacier once laid. The waterfall can be reached after a short hike from the Sperry Chalet via the Sperry Trail.

References

Waterfalls of Glacier National Park (U.S.)